The East Town Street Historic District is a historic district in Downtown Columbus, Ohio. The site was listed on the National Register of Historic Places in 1976 and the Columbus Register of Historic Properties in 1982; the district boundaries differ between the two entries.

The Snowden-Gray House, a High Victorian-style two-and-a-half-story mansion with a cupola, built in 1852, is salient in the district. It was the Kappa Kappa Gamma National Headquarters from 1952 to 2018. It housed the Heritage Museum, displaying the history of the organization. The building now serves as an event space.

The Kelton House Museum and Garden is a historic house museum in the district.

Gallery

See also
 National Register of Historic Places listings in Columbus, Ohio

References

External links
 

National Register of Historic Places in Columbus, Ohio
Historic districts on the National Register of Historic Places in Ohio
1976 establishments in Ohio
Columbus Register properties
Historic districts in Columbus, Ohio
Buildings in downtown Columbus, Ohio